Ross Case and Geoff Masters were the defending champions but lost in the final [8–6] to Brian Gottfried and Raúl Ramírez.

Seeds

Draw

Finals

Top half

Bottom half

External links
1975 Custom Credit Indoor Tennis Tournament Doubles Draw

Doubles